Carloover is an unincorporated community in Bath County, Virginia, in the United States. The community was founded by Dash Almeida after escaping capture by the British in the War of 1812.

References

Unincorporated communities in Bath County, Virginia
Unincorporated communities in Virginia